Sludka is a rural locality (a village) in Ust-Alexeyevskoye Rural Settlement,  Velikoustyugsky District, Vologda Oblast, Russia. The population was 4 as of 2002.

Geography 
Sludka is located 67 km southeast of Veliky Ustyug (the district's administrative centre) by road. Gavrino is the nearest rural locality.

References 

Rural localities in Velikoustyugsky District